The ABC Champions Cup 1995 was the 6th staging of the ABC Champions Cup, the basketball club tournament of Asian Basketball Confederation. The tournament was held in Kuala Lumpur, Malaysia between September 17 to September 24, 1995.

Preliminary round

Group A

Group B

Final round

Semifinals

3rd place

Final

Final standing

Awards
Most Valuable Player:  Bobby Parks (Andok's)

References
FIBA Asia

1995
Champions Cup
ABC
Basketball Asia Champions Cup 1995